The OKS (Ortaöğretim Kurumları Giriş Sınavı) was the high school entrance examination in Turkey until 2007. It had 100 questions which were to be solved within 120 minutes and was mandatory for getting a place in a good high school in Turkey. In the examination, students solved:

25 Turkish language questions (Grammar & Paragraph),
25 Math questions (Math & Geometry),
25 Science questions (Physics, Chemistry & Biology),
25 Social studies questions (History, Geography & Religion (5)*)
Students who did not take religion could choose instead to solve five additional geography and history questions

Abolishment
The exam was abolished in 2007 by the Turkish Ministry of Education and was replaced by the SBS exams, spread out over three years. The last OKS exam was administered on 8 June 2008 at 10:00 AM for 8th graders.

See also
YÖS exam
Education in Turkey
List of high schools in Turkey

Education in Turkey
Standardized tests in Turkey